Calicium tricolor is a crustose lichen that is found growing on trees in the South West region of Western Australia.

References

tricolor
Lichen species
Lichens described in 1889
Lichens of Australia